Putra Indoor Stadium (Malay: Stadium Putra), currently named as Axiata Arena for sponsorship reasons, is a multi-purpose indoor arena in Kuala Lumpur, Malaysia.

Background 
The stadium is located in the premise of the National Sports Complex of Bukit Jalil, Kuala Lumpur, Malaysia. It is one of several sports facilities in the National Sports Complex which includes the main stadium, Bukit Jalil National Stadium, National Hockey Stadium, National Squash Centre, and National Aquatic Centre and also a Seri Putra Hall

The arena has the highest seating capacity of any indoor venue in Malaysia with a maximum capacity of 16,000 seats. The stadium has 3 main doors which lead to a rectangular arena 69 × 25 meters large, which can adapt to different sports formats like boxing, badminton, basketball, volleyball, table tennis, judo, handball, wrestling and gymnastics. The stadium is also fully customisable for concerts during both day and night due to its opaque roof and can attract up to 11,000 audiences.

History 
On 15 August 2009, former Malaysia's Prime Minister Tun Abdullah Ahmad Badawi opened the 2009 ASEAN Para Games in Putra Indoor Stadium. Closing ceremonies on 19 August 2009 were also attended by the Youth and Sports Minister of Malaysia. The main venue for the gymnastics competitions during Kuala Lumpur 1998 Commonwealth Games, this was also the venue for sport and entertainment events such as World Equestrian Games, Disney's on Ice and more.
 
On 31 August 2010, Putra Indoor Stadium hosted the Independence Day Parade. This was in view of the ongoing Ramadhan season. It was also the first time the Independence Day Parade was held indoors. The celebration was attended by the Yang Di-Pertuan Agong of Malaysia, the Prime Minister of Malaysia and also cabinet members.

Rebranded as Axiata Arena 

On 16 January 2017 Putra Stadium has been rebranded as Axiata Arena in an effort towards building a sporting nation. This is Malaysia's first corporate name stadium in partnership between Axiata Group Berhad and Perbadanan Stadium Malaysia (PSM). Axiata Arena will be the landmark for the redevelopment of Bukit Jalil Sports Complex which will be known as KL Sports City (KLSC).

During the COVID-19 vaccination period in Malaysia, Axiata Arena is used as a large-scale vaccination center in Klang Valley to vaccinate the residents of Kuala Lumpur and Selangor area.

Notable events
Gymnastics – 1998 Commonwealth Games
Faye Wong Scenic Tour, 21–22 August 1999
Thomas Cup and Uber Cup 2000
Westlife Where Dreams Come True Tour, 26 May 2001
 Tang Long Imperial World Dragon and Lion Dance Championship 2002
WWE Smackdown Live in Malaysia 2002
Force of Nature concert for the tsunami benefit 2005 (Backstreet Boys, Black Eyed Peas, Boyz II Men, Lauryn Hill, Wyclef Jean)
 Sting (musician) Sacred Love Tour, 1 February 2005
Jacky Cheung's Classic Musical – Snow Wolf Lake 2005, 25–26 November 2005
2006 AYA Festival with Delirious? Asian Youth Ambassadors
2007 BWF World Championships
2009 ASEAN Para Games
Sandy Lam Live 09 Concert, 28 November 2009
2010 Independence Day Parade (first National Day celebration in an indoor stadium, third stadium celebration)
Adam Lambert Glam Nation Tour, 14 October 2010
Super Show 2 – Super Junior, The 2nd ASIA Tour, 20 March 2010, with a sold-out crowd of 14,833 people.
Super Show 3 – Super Junior, The 3rd ASIA Tour, 19 March 2011, with a sold-out crowd of 11,980 people.
Faye Wong's Comeback Tour 2010–12, 6 November 2011
Jacky Cheung 1/2 Century World Tour – Jacky Cheung, 8–11 December 2011
Malaysia Open Super Series
Disney on Ice
Disney's High School Musical: The Ice Tour
Annual Cheerleading Contests organized by The Star newspaper
Annual national-level secondary schools' brass band competition organised by the Ministry of Education
Westlife Gravity Tour 2011, 7 October 2011
Whitesnake Forevermore Tour  30 October 2011
Anugerah Juara Lagu 26, 2011
One Fighting Championship, 2 February 2013
Mayday NOW-HERE World Tour in Malaysia, 2–3 March 2013
S.H.E 2gether 4ever World Tour, 20 July 2013
Super Show 5 – Super Junior, 23 November 2013, with a sold-out crowd of 13,985 people and revenue $1,855,292. 
Alicia Keys Set The World on Fire Tour, 27 November 2013
Taylor Swift The Red Tour, 11 June 2014 (The sold-out show was attended by 7,525 fans)
WWE Live Event, 10–11 October 2014
Michael Bublé Live in Kuala Lumpur Concert, 27 January 2014
Stefanie Sun Kepler World Tour, 20 December 2014
G.E.M. X.X.X. Live Tour, 23–24 January 2015
16th IIFA Awards, 5 June 2015
Big Bang Made World Tour, 24–25 July 2015
Ed Sheeran ÷ Tour, 14 November 2017
G.E.M. Queen of Hearts World Tour in Malaysia, 18 November 2017
Hatsune Miku Miku Expo, 16 December 2017
Jacky Cheung A Classic Tour, 26–28 January 2018
Anugerah Juara Lagu 32, 12 February 2018
Anugerah MeleTOP ERA 2018, 8 April 2018
Bruno Mars 24K Magic World Tour, 9 May 2018
Exo planet #4 – The EℓyXiOn in Kuala Lumpur, 7 July 2018
Manny Pacquiao vs. Lucas Matthysse, 15 July 2018
Wanna One One: The World Live in Malaysia, 21 July 2018
JJ Lin Sanctuary World Tour, 7–8 September 2018
Boyzone 25th Anniversary World Tour in Malaysia, 24 August 2018
The Kuala Lumpur Major, 9–18 November 2018
LAZADA 11.11 SUPER SHOW, 10 November 2018 (Special guest : KARD)
Anugerah Juara Lagu 33, 3 February 2019
Joker Xue Skyscraper World Tour in Kuala Lumpur, 16 February 2019
Dato' Sri Siti Nurhaliza On Tour, 16 March 2019
Ong Seong-wu Fan Meeting Eternity Tour Live in Kuala Lumpur, 23 March 2019
Anugerah MeleTOP ERA 2019, 21 April 2019
Jason Mraz Good Vibes Tour, 13 May 2019
Twice World Tour 2019 "Twicelights", 17 August 2019
Shawn Mendes: The Tour, 5 October 2019
M1 Mobile Legends World Championships, 15–17 November 2019
EXO: EXO PLANET #5- EXplOration, 14 December 2019
IU (singer): 2019 IU Tour Concert 〈Love, Poem〉, 21 December 2019
Namewee 4896 World Tour, 31 December 2019
 WINNER CROSS TOUR in KUALA LUMPUR, 18 January 2020
 Anugerah Juara Lagu 34, 9 February 2020
SEVENTEEN World Tour: 'Ode To You', 22 February 2020 - *(CANCELLED due to COVID-19)
Super Junior Super Show 8: Infinite Time, 1 March 2020 - *(CANCELLED due to COVID-19)
GOT7 World Tour 2019–2020 "KEEP SPINNING", 7 March 2020 - *(CANCELLED due to COVID-19)
 Anugerah MeleTOP ERA 2020, 20 December 2020
 Dewa 19 Tour 30 Tahun 30 Kota, 9 - 10 September 2022

References

External links

National Sports Complex Malaysia
Cuti.my Description page

Sports venues in Kuala Lumpur
Indoor arenas in Malaysia
Badminton venues in Malaysia
Gymnastics venues in Malaysia
Music venues in Malaysia
Sports venues completed in 1992
Wrestling venues
Axiata